The United Political Party was a political party in the Cook Islands.  It was founded shortly before the 1965 election and was led by the then-Leader of Government Business, D. C. Brown.  It ran 16 candidates, 4 of which were elected; Brown himself lost his seat. The party fell apart after the election, though some members went on to participate in the United Cook Islanders.

References

Defunct political parties in the Cook Islands
Political parties established in 1965
1965 establishments in Oceania